This article concerns the period 319 BC – 310 BC.

References